Mateo Zefi (born 13 April 1994 in Shkodër) is an Albanian football player, who currently plays for Italian lower league side USD Rignanese.

Club career
On 19 July 2019, he then joined Italian club, Rignanese Calcio, after one season at another Italian club, US Tonara ASD.

References

External links
 Profile - FSHF

1994 births
Living people
Footballers from Shkodër
Albanian footballers
Association football defenders
KS Ada Velipojë players
Juventus IF players
KF Vllaznia Shkodër players
KF Laçi players
Besëlidhja Lezhë players
KF Shënkolli players
Kategoria Superiore players
Kategoria e Parë players
Albanian expatriate footballers
Albanian expatriate sportspeople in Sweden
Expatriate footballers in Sweden
Albanian expatriate sportspeople in Italy
Expatriate footballers in Italy